This is a List of United Kingdom uniformed services which includes all uniformed public, emergency, armed and charity services in the United Kingdom and overseas territories.

The services listed here are national, regional, local, recognised, emergency, public-serving, military and educational and support services.

Members generally wear uniform, with distinct insignia so they can be identified in their distinct role. Rank structures are similar and similarities can be found between services. Some services may overlap and some may carry out similar duties.

National Uniformed Services

British armed forces

His Majesty's Naval Service
Royal Navy
Royal Marines
Royal Fleet Auxiliary
Royal Naval Reserve
Royal Marines Reserve
Naval Careers Service
British Army 
Royal Air Force (RAF)

Civil uniformed services
Merchant Navy (United Kingdom) - civilian shipping
Ministry of Defence Guard Service - Guarding MoD land and establishments

Law enforcement

Ministry of Defence Police
Civil Nuclear Constabulary
Border Force
HM Revenue and Customs 
National Crime Agency (Limited powers in Northern Ireland)
Royal Military Police (Part of the British Army)
Royal Air Force Police (Part of the Royal Air Force)
Royal Navy Police (Part of the Royal Naval Service)
Royal Marines Police
Military Provost Guard Service (Part of the British Army)
Water Bailiffs
Civil Enforcement Officer

Fire and rescue services

 Defence Fire and Rescue Service
 Various Airport Firefighting and Rescue Services

Healthcare and medical services

 British Red Cross

Rescue and support services
British Red Cross
His Majesty's Coastguard
National Coastwatch Institution
Royal National Lifeboat Institution
Royal Voluntary Service
Royal Air Force Mountain Rescue Service (Part of the Royal Air Force)
The Salvation Army

Uniformed youth organisations

Army Cadet Force (ACF)
Air Training Corps (ATC)
Sea Cadet Corps (SCC)
Combined Cadet Force (CCF)
Volunteer Cadet Corps (VCF)
Royal Marines Volunteer Cadet Corps (RM VCC)
The Scout Association 
The Baden-Powell Scouts' Association 
Girlguiding (GG)
Boys' Brigade (BB)

Uniformed services of England

Police and law enforcement

Territorial police forces

Metropolitan Police Service (MPS, or 'The Met')
City of London Police
Avon and Somerset Police
Bedfordshire Police
Cambridgeshire Constabulary
Cheshire Constabulary
Cleveland Police
Cumbria Constabulary
Derbyshire Constabulary
Devon and Cornwall Police
Dorset Police
Durham Constabulary
Essex Police
Gloucestershire Constabulary
Hampshire and Isle of Wight Constabulary
Hertfordshire Constabulary
Humberside Police
Kent Police
Lancashire Constabulary
Leicestershire Police
Lincolnshire Police
Greater Manchester Police (GMP)
West Mercia Police
Merseyside Police
West Midlands Police
Norfolk Constabulary
Northamptonshire Police
Northumbria Police
Nottinghamshire Police
Staffordshire Police
Suffolk Constabulary
Surrey Police
Sussex Police
Thames Valley Police (TVP)
Warwickshire Police
Wiltshire Police
North Yorkshire Police
South Yorkshire Police
West Yorkshire Police

Parks police

Epping Forest Keepers
Hampstead Heath Constabulary
Hillingdon Parks Patrol Service
Kew Constabulary
Wandsworth Parks and Events Police

Cathedral constables

Canterbury Cathedral Close Constables
Chester Cathedral Constables
Liverpool Cathedral Constables
York Minster Police

Ports police

Port of Bristol Police
Port of Dover Police
Falmouth Docks Police
Port of Felixstowe Police
Port of Portland Police
Port of Liverpool Police
Tees and Hartlepool Port Authority Harbour Police
Port of Tilbury Police

Other police forces

Border Force
British Transport Police (BTP)
Cambridge University Constabulary
Mersey Tunnels Police

Other enforcement agencies

Ministry of Defence Guard Service (MGS)
Driver and Vehicle Standards Agency (DVSA)
Environment Agency (EA)
Forestry Commission
National Highways traffic officers
Her Majesty's Prison Service (HMPS)

Fire and rescue services

Avon Fire and Rescue Service
Bedfordshire Fire and Rescue Service
Royal Berkshire Fire and Rescue Service
Buckinghamshire Fire and Rescue Service
Cambridgeshire Fire and Rescue Service
Cheshire Fire and Rescue Service
Cleveland Fire Brigade
Cornwall Fire and Rescue Service
Cumbria Fire and Rescue Service
Derbyshire Fire and Rescue Service
Devon and Somerset Fire and Rescue Service
Dorset and Wiltshire Fire and Rescue Service
County Durham and Darlington Fire and Rescue Service
Essex County Fire and Rescue Service
Gloucestershire Fire and Rescue Service
Hampshire & Isle of Wight Fire and Rescue Service
Hereford and Worcester Fire and Rescue Service
Hertfordshire Fire and Rescue Service
Humberside Fire and Rescue Service
Kent Fire and Rescue Service
Lancashire Fire and Rescue Service
Leicestershire Fire and Rescue Service
Lincolnshire Fire and Rescue Service
London Fire Brigade (LFB)
Greater Manchester Fire and Rescue Service
Merseyside Fire and Rescue Service
West Midlands Fire Service
Norfolk Fire and Rescue Service
Northamptonshire Fire and Rescue Service
Northumberland Fire and Rescue Service
Nottinghamshire Fire and Rescue Service
Oxfordshire Fire and Rescue Service
Isles of Scilly Fire and Rescue Service
Shropshire Fire and Rescue Service
Staffordshire Fire and Rescue Service
Suffolk Fire and Rescue Service
Surrey Fire and Rescue Service
East Sussex Fire and Rescue Service
West Sussex Fire and Rescue Service
Tyne and Wear Fire and Rescue Service
Warwickshire Fire and Rescue Service
North Yorkshire Fire and Rescue Service
South Yorkshire Fire and Rescue Service
West Yorkshire Fire and Rescue Service

Healthcare and medical services

National Health Service (NHS)

London Ambulance Service NHS Trust
East of England Ambulance Service NHS Trust
East Midlands Ambulance Service NHS Trust
West Midlands Ambulance Service University NHS Foundation Trust
North East Ambulance Service NHS Foundation Trust
North West Ambulance Service NHS Trust
South Central Ambulance Service NHS Foundation Trust
South East Coast Ambulance Service NHS Foundation Trust
South Western Ambulance Service NHS Foundation Trust
Yorkshire Ambulance Service NHS Trust
NHS Blood and Transplant Blood Donation

Charity and voluntary aid services

British Red Cross
St John Ambulance England
British Association for Immediate Care
Hatzalah (London, Gateshead, and Manchester)
Salvation Army

Air ambulances

The Air Ambulance Service
Magpas Air Ambulance
London's Air Ambulance Charity
Cornwall Air Ambulance Trust
Devon Air Ambulance Trust
Dorset and Somerset Air Ambulance
East Anglian Air Ambulance (EAAA)
Essex & Herts Air Ambulance Trust
Great North Air Ambulance Service
Hampshire & Isle of Wight Air Ambulance
Air Ambulance Kent Surrey Sussex
Lincolnshire & Nottinghamshire Air Ambulance
Midlands Air Ambulance Charity
North West Air Ambulance
Thames Valley Air Ambulance
Wiltshire Air Ambulance
Yorkshire Air Ambulance

Rescue and support services

Mountain Rescue England and Wales
British Cave Rescue Council
National Coastwatch Institution
RAF Mountain Rescue Service (RAFMRS)
4x4 Response
Sky Watch Civil Air Patrol
Severn Area Rescue Association
Ryde Inshore Rescue Service
Solent Rescue
Southport Offshore Rescue Trust

Lifeboats

Burnham Area Rescue Boat
Caister Volunteer Lifeboat Service
Freshwater Independent Lifeboat
Gosport and Fareham Inshore Rescue
Hope Cove Life Boat
Mundesley Volunteer Inshore Lifeboat
Runswick Bay Rescue Boat
Sandown and Shanklin Independent Lifeboat Service
Sea Palling Independent Lifeboat

Uniformed youth organisations

Volunteer Police Cadets
Girls Venture Corps Air Cadets
St John Ambulance England Cadets
European Scout Federation

Uniformed Services of Wales

Law enforcement 

 Dyfed-Powys Police (Heddlu Dyfed Powys)
Gwent Police (Heddlu Gwent)
North Wales Police (Heddlu Gogledd Cymru)
South Wales Police (Heddlu De Cymru)
British Transport Police 
Ministry of Defence Guard Service
Driver and Vehicle Standards Agency
Vale of Glamorgan Council Enforcement Officers
Welsh Government Traffic Officers

Fire and rescue services 

 Mid and West Wales Fire and Rescue Service
 North Wales Fire and Rescue Service
 South Wales Fire and Rescue Service

Healthcare and medical services

National Health Service 

 Welsh Ambulance Service NHS Trust
 Welsh Blood Service
 Emergency Medical Retrieval and Transfer Service Cymru (Funded by Welsh Government, run with Wales Air Ambulance)

Charity and voluntary aid services 

 St John Ambulance Cymru
 British Association for Immediate Care
 Blood Bikes Wales
 Wales Air Ambulance Charitable Trust

Rescue and support services 

 Mountain Rescue England and Wales
 British Cave Rescue Council
 4x4 Response
 Severn Area Rescue Association

Uniformed youth organisations 

 Volunteer Police Cadets

Uniformed Services of Scotland

Law enforcement 

 Police Scotland
 Scottish Prison Service
 British Transport Police 
 Ministry of Defence Guard Service
 Scottish Environment Protection Agency
 Driver and Vehicle Standards Agency

Fire and rescue services 

 Scottish Fire and Rescue Service

Healthcare and medical services

National Health Service 

 Scottish Ambulance Service (Includes Scottish Air Ambulance)
 Scottish National Blood Transfusion Service

Charity and voluntary aid services 

 St Andrew's First Aid
 British Association for Immediate Care Scotland
 Scotland's Charity Air Ambulance

Rescue and support services 

 Mountain Rescue Committee of Scotland
 British Cave Rescue Council
 Glasgow Humane Society Lifeboat
 St Abbs Lifeboat

Uniformed Services of Northern Ireland

Law enforcement 

 Police Service of Northern Ireland
 Belfast Harbour Police
 Belfast International Airport Constabulary
 Northern Ireland Prison Service
 Northern Ireland Security Guard Service
 Northern Ireland Environment Agency
 Forest Service Northern Ireland
 Driver and Vehicle Agency

Fire and rescue services 

 Northern Ireland Fire and Rescue Service

Healthcare and medical services 

 Northern Ireland Ambulance Service HSC Trust
 Northern Ireland Blood Transfusion Service

Charity and voluntary aid services 

 St John Ambulance Northern Ireland
 British Association for Immediate Care Northern Ireland
 Air Ambulance Northern Ireland

Rescue and support services 

 Irish Cave Rescue Organisation (Shared with the Republic of Ireland)

Defunct

Some uniformed services were formed at times of national emergency and have since been disbanded and/or replaced. Other agencies have been superseded/merged.

Civil
Civil Defence Service
Civil Defence Corps
Home Guard

See also
British Armed Forces
Law enforcement in the United Kingdom

References



British Overseas Territories - police
Uniformed services by country